Devaguptam is situated in Dr. B.R. Ambedkar Konaseema district in Allavaram Mandal, in Andhra Pradesh State.

References

Villages in Allavaram mandal